Evergreen Plantation is a plantation located on the west side of the Mississippi River in St. John the Baptist Parish, near Wallace, Louisiana, and along Louisiana Highway 18.  The main house was constructed mostly in 1790, and renovated to its current Greek Revival style in 1832. The plantation's historical commodity crop was sugarcane, cultivated by enslaved African Americans until emancipation. 

The plantation operated until about 1930, when the Depression resulted in the owners abandoning the house. The plantation continued to produce sugar cane under the direction of the bank that owned it, and it is still a working sugar cane plantation today. The house was extensively restored during the 1940s, with 300,000 bricks from the demolished Uncle Sam Plantation used in the restoration.

Description

The plantation includes 37 contributing buildings, all but eight of them antebellum, making it one of the most complete plantation complexes in the state and the South.  Of great significance are the 22 slave quarters, arranged in a double row along an allée of oak trees.

Among the outbuildings are a garconnière, where young bachelors of the family or male guests could stay; a pigeonnier for keeping pigeons (a sign of status among the planters); an overseer's cottage; and late 
19th-century barns.

National Historic Landmark
Because of its quality and significance, the plantation was included among the first 26 featured sites on the Louisiana African American Heritage Trail. It was designated as a National Historic Landmark in 1992 for its rich architectural legacy.  The house is open for tours every day except Sundays; tour times are at 9:30 am, 11:15 am, 1:00 pm, and 2:45 pm.

Heiress and businesswoman, Matilda Geddings Gray (1885–1971) sponsored the restoration project in the 1940s, and it is now a U.S. National Historic Landmark.

In popular culture
It is a production site of films such as Django Unchained (2012) and Antebellum (2020).

See also
Whitney Plantation Historic District, also located in Wallace
Louisiana African American Heritage Trail 
National Register of Historic Places listings in St. John the Baptist Parish, Louisiana
List of National Historic Landmarks in Louisiana
Plantation complexes in the Southern United States

References

External links

 Louisiana's African American Heritage Trail at LouisianaTravel.com
 Evergreen Plantation Website
 Louisiana Digital Library – Evergreen Plantation

National Historic Landmarks in Louisiana
Louisiana African American Heritage Trail
Sugar plantations in Louisiana
Historic house museums in Louisiana
Museums in St. John the Baptist Parish, Louisiana
Houses in St. John the Baptist Parish, Louisiana
Houses completed in 1832
Plantation houses in Louisiana
National Register of Historic Places in St. John the Baptist Parish, Louisiana
Slave cabins and quarters in the United States
1832 establishments in Louisiana